Tubará is a municipality and town in the Colombian department of Atlántico.

References

External links
 Tubara official website
 Gobernacion del Atlantico - Tubará

Municipalities of Atlántico Department